William Robert Fremantle was the Dean of Ripon from 1876  until his death on 8 March 1895.

He was born on 30 August 1807 and educated at Westminster and Christ Church, Oxford. In 1828 he became a Fellow of Magdalen College, Oxford, and Curate of Swanbourne. He held incumbencies in Pitchcott and Middle Claydon before his elevation to the Deanery.

He was the brother of Thomas Fremantle, 1st Baron Cottesloe, and therefore uncle of the Hon William Fremantle, who succeeded Fremantle as Dean of Ripon.

References

1807 births
People educated at Westminster School, London
Alumni of Christ Church, Oxford
Fellows of Magdalen College, Oxford
Deans of Ripon
1895 deaths